Field mouse may refer to:
in Europe, Asia and North Africa, one of several species of mice in the genus Apodemus
in North America, a small vole such as the meadow vole
in South America, one of several species of mice in the genus Akodon
 "Field Mice" (CSI), a 2010 episode of CSI
The Field Mice, a indie rock band
Field Mouse (band), a Brooklyn, New York-based dream pop band

Animal common name disambiguation pages